Robb Montgomery is a filmmaker, journalism professor and an author of academic textbooks and diploma courses in mobile journalism.

He is a former Chicago newspaper editor, and founder of a social network for journalists, Visual Editors.

In 2011 he developed the mobile journalism training, technology and workflows used by hundreds of Radio Free Europe (RFE/RL) reporters and correspondents in 23 countries.

He is listed in the U.S. Speaker's bureau as a mobile journalism expert and delivers workshops to journalism groups for U.S Embassies worldwide.

Montgomery is the author of “Mobile Journalism” (Visual Editors – 2020) and “Smartphone Video Storytelling” (Routledge Press: Taylor & Francis Group — 2018).

He is a distinguished visiting professor at the EFJ School of New Journalism in Paris and at  American University, Cairo where he leads Mobile Reporting and Story Lab workshops to promote entrepreneurial and video storytelling.

He designed the IREX Multimedia Education Center  - a USAID-funded broadcast training facility in Tbilisi, Georgia built entirely around mobile journalism.

Montgomery is the director of the  Smart Film School an online academy that produced diploma courses and certified training in mobile journalism and documentary filmmaking.

Previously, Montgomery worked as an editor for the Chicago Sun-Times and the Chicago Tribune and led large-scale redesign projects at several publications including the Chicago Sun-Times, Leadership, and The San Francisco Examiner.

Early life
Montgomery was born in Naperville, Illinois in 1964 and currently resides in Berlin, Germany. He began his career as a graphics journalist at the Fort Lauderdale Sun-Sentinel in 1990 after graduating from Eastern Illinois University with a degree in journalism. He held a number of editorial positions for newspapers in Florida and Illinois between 1990 and 2005.

Career
Montgomery worked as a newspaper editor and designer from 1990 to 2005 and was a principal editor and the designer of Chicago's Red Streak newspaper  that was published by the Chicago Sun-Times starting in October, 2002 as a competitor to the Chicago Tribune'''s RedEye tabloid.

As a visual editor, he led the 2003 redesign of the Chicago Sun-Times and the 2005 redesign of The San Francisco Examiner.
In 2004, he founded Visual Editors, a non-profit that connects and provides educational resources for visual journalists worldwide. 
In 2005, he redesigned The Examiner newspaper for the San Francisco, Washington, D.C. and Baltimore metro markets.

Montgomery redesigned the business section for The San Jose Mercury News in early 2007.

In 2005, he retired from the Chicago Sun-Times to launch a consulting business and begin teaching visual journalism methods with media development projects worldwide.

 Mobile Journalism 
Montgomery has trained more than 20,000 people in mobile journalism methods including the United Nations, CNN, The New York Times and the Danish School of Journalism. in Since 2007 he has worked with USAID-funded Media Development projects in Egypt and Georgia and developed and produced multimedia training, mobile and digital journalism workshops in more than 22 countries.

in 2011 he pioneered the mobile journalism strategy, training and workflows for Radio Free Europe - the first international broadcaster to train their entire staff in mobile journalism methods and also to outfit journalists with a custom mobile reporting app that Montgomery designed.

As the author and concept designer of the IREX S.M.A.R.T. Media Lab  and mobile-first newsroom center in Tbilisi, Georgia, Montgomery designed a multi-purpose broadcast studio and training center to serve several journalism schools and Radio Liberty producers.

Montgomery published his first book on mobile journalism in 2014 - "A Field Guide for Mobile Journalism."

In 2015 he launched the Smart Film School as an online video academy to deliver training course packs for educators. The school includes more than 450 video tutorials organized into masterclasses that professors and students use to learn mobile journalism, mobile filmmaking and innovation methods.

In 2018, Routledge Press (New York and London) published Montgomery's second book "Smartphone Video Storytelling" as a hybrid textbook that includes a rich library of e-learning materials.

Visual Editors
Working as the group's CEO, Montgomery incorporated the Visual Editors social network in 2004 as a 501(c)(3) non-profit charity, positioning the site as an educational exchange for student and professional journalists working in the world's newsrooms. The charity is operated by a volunteer board of directors.

Journalism educator
Since leaving the Chicago Sun-Times'' in 2005, Montgomery has worked as a journalism educator for U.S. and foreign media groups including the Thomson Reuters Foundation, WAN-IFRA, Egypt Media Development Group, Pennsylvania Newspaper Association, IFRA, and INMA.

Since 2003 he has been hired as a distinguished visiting professor to develop and teach journalism courses at the Medill School of Journalism, Northwestern University, Cairo University, EFJ School of new journalism in Paris, FH Wien School of journalism, the Danish School of Journalism and Stockholm University.

References

External links
 MediaShift . Digging Deeper: Traditional Journalism Job Cuts Countered by Digital Additions | PBS
 'RedStreak' Designer Leaves 'Sun-Times' | Editor and Publisher
 About the Visual Editors Foundation

American male journalists
American newspaper editors
Chicago Sun-Times people
Living people
1964 births